Maryan Bakalarczyk (27 October 1927 – 9 April 2021) was a Belgian footballer who played as a midfielder or defender.

Club career 
Bakalarczyk was born in Zagorna, Poland. He played for R.F.C. Tilleur from 1945 to 1949 appearing in the Belgian First Division and Belgian Second Division. He joined R. Charleroi S.C. along with his brother Stanislav in 1949. He went on to play 120 matches scoring 14 goals in the First Division for Charleroi until 1954. He made 53 appearances in the First Division for Standard Liège between 1954 and 1957. An accident at work in summer 1958 required the amputation of a foot ending his career as a footballer.

A naturalised Belgian, Bakalarczyk represented Belgium internationally at youth level.

He died on 9 April 2021, aged 93.

References

External links
 

1927 births
2021 deaths
Belgian footballers
Association football midfielders
Association football defenders
Belgium youth international footballers
Belgian Pro League players
Challenger Pro League players
R.F.C. Tilleur players
R. Charleroi S.C. players
Standard Liège players
Polish emigrants to Belgium